Ahmadvand may refer to:

Ahmadvand, Kermanshah
Ahmadvand, Lorestan